Kantilal L. Kalani (1930–1998) was an Indian philosopher and writer in Gujarati literature. He is best known for translating the Tirukkural into Gujarati.

Biography
Kantilal Kalani worked with the United States Information Service as head of the Department of Gujarati for 25 years. He wrote over 65 books in Gujarati on philosophy and spiritual knowledge. In 1971, he translated the ancient Tamil moral literature of the Tirukkural into Gujarati, which was published in Bombay.

Works
 Hasatamramatam Hari Malya (1992), published by Gurjara Grantharatna Karyalaya
 Song of the Soul (with Indravadan C. Shah)
 Jivansanket (Gujarati edition)
 Atmabodhana
 Santa Tukarama Antarangano Asvada
 Anantarabhayo Ujasa
 Upanishadonum Acamana
 Amrtanum Acamana: Urdhva Darsana
 Brahmasukhano Anubhava
 Romaromamam Diva
 Atmadipa
 Jivanani Mavajata
 Mahabharat

See also
 List of Gujarati-language writers
 Tirukkural translations
 Tirukkural translations into Gujarati

References

Tamil–Gujarati translators
Translators of the Tirukkural into Gujarati
1930 births
1998 deaths
20th-century translators
Tirukkural translators
Gujarati literature